Moldulhøi is a mountain on the border of Skjåk Municipality and Lom Municipality in Innlandet county, Norway. The mountain is surrounded by several other notable mountains including Lomseggi and Lendfjellet to the east, Storhøi to the south, Sandgrovhøi and Hesthøi to the southwest, Hestdalshøgdi to the west, and Tverrfjellet to the northwest.

See also
List of mountains of Norway

References

Skjåk
Lom, Norway
Mountains of Innlandet